The Brunau is a  long stream of Lower Saxony, Germany, in the district of Celle, on the Lüneburg Heath.

Source and course 
Here it swings east, runs past Bonstorf to the north and then continues in a southeastern direction. North of the village of Baven the stream is dammed. Originally it powered a water mill here, the Backebergsmühle, a water-driven corn mill. The Brunau flows right under the building. Shortly before its mouth the Brunau merges with an old, now overgrown, meadow-irrigation channel. With this channel it discharges into the Örtze near Baven north of Hermannsburg.

Water quality 
The Brunau derives its name from its brown (Low German: bruun) water. Its quality however is Class II throughout: moderately polluted.

See also 
List of rivers of Lower Saxony

References 

Rivers of Lower Saxony
Lüneburg Heath
Rivers of Germany